Cuchuco is a soup, part of Native American cuisine of South America associated with the Muisca people, made with corn, barley or wheat and mashed beans, popular in Colombian cuisine, especially Altiplano of the Boyacá and Cundinamarca Departments of Colombia. It is a staple food in Colombia, where it is often made with peas, potatoes, wheat and beans.

An inexpensive food, it is usually eaten with pork, peas, carrot, potatoes, garlic, onion and cilantro. It is popular in Andean region and the plateau cundiboyacense.

Etymology 
The word's origin is indigenous from the Chibcha language of the Muisca people. Pedro José Ramírez Sendoya proposes that the word's provenenace is from one of various words used in regional native languages.

See also
Arepa
Sancocho
Tamales

References 

Colombian soups
Legume dishes
Barley-based dishes
Maize dishes
Indigenous cuisine of the Americas
Staple foods